Klodian Nuri (born 23 July 1995) is an Albanian footballer who plays as a forward for Kategoria e Parë club Turbina.

Honours
Individual
Kategoria e Parë Golden Shoe: 2019–20

References

1995 births
Living people
Footballers from Tirana
Albanian footballers
Association football forwards
Shkëndija Tiranë players
KF Besa Kavajë players
KS Kastrioti players
FK Partizani Tirana players
FK Vora players
KF Elbasani players
KF Oriku players
KF Turbina players
Kategoria e Dytë players
Kategoria e Parë players